Aulonemia robusta is a species of Aulonemia bamboo.

The species is part of the grass family and is endemic to Latin America.

References

robusta